Microchilo eromenalis is a moth in the family Crambidae. It was described by George Hampson in 1919. It is found on Sumbawa in Indonesia.

References

Diptychophorini
Moths described in 1919